Andrés María Hipólito Casiano José Antonio Cayetano Fernández Pacheco y Moscoso Acuña Silva Manrique Girón Portocarrero y Portugal, twice Grandee of Spain, 10th Duke of Escalona, 10th Marquis of Villena, 16th Count of Castañeda, 12th Count of San Esteban de Gormaz and 10th Count of Xiquena (13 August 1710 – 27 June 1746), was a Spanish aristocrat and academician.

He was born and died in Madrid, the son and grandson of the 1st and 2nd Directors of the Royal Spanish Academy. Himself became a member at the age of 16, on 25 April 1726. He married Ana María de Toledo Portugal y Córdoba, 11th Countess of Oropesa in 1727, who gave him two daughters and died in 1729. He married for a second time with Isabel María Pacheco Téllez-Girón y Toledo in 1731. Fernández Pacheco became the 3rd lifetime Director of the Royal Spanish Academy at the death of his father in 1738 (aged 28). He was promoted to be a Knight of the Order of the Golden Fleece. He died at the age of 36 in 1746.

He was succeeded as Duke of Escalona by his daughter María López Pacheco, who married her uncle and his brother, Juan López Pacheco.

Some references
http://www.fuenterrebollo.com/Heraldica-Piedra/marqueses-villena-segovia.html

|-

|-

|-

1710 births
1746 deaths
Counts of Spain
Counts of San Esteban de Gormaz
110
Marquesses of Villena
Knights of the Golden Fleece of Spain
Members of the Royal Spanish Academy
Grandees of Spain

Spanish nobility